Pediasia serraticornis is a species of moth in the family Crambidae described by George Hampson in 1900. It is found in Spain, Algeria, Tunisia, Libya, Jordan, Syria and Israel.

The wingspan is about 22 mm. Adults are pale grey, slightly tinged with brown. There are some black scales near the base of the inner margin of the forewings. The hindwings have an obscure fuscous terminal band.

References

Moths described in 1900
Crambini
Moths of Europe
Moths of Africa
Moths of Asia